This is a list of video games for the Nintendo 64 video game console that have sold or shipped at least one million copies. The best-selling game on the Nintendo 64 is Super Mario 64. First released in Japan on June 23, 1996, it was a launch title for the system and the first Super Mario game to use three-dimensional graphics. The game went on to sell nearly 12million units worldwide. Mario Kart 64, the second in the Mario Kart series, is the second-best-selling game on the platform, with sales of more than 9.8million units. The console's top five is rounded out by Rare's GoldenEye 007 in third, with sales of just over 8million units, The Legend of Zelda: Ocarina of Time in fourth, with 7.6million units sold worldwide, and Super Smash Bros. in fifth, with sales of more than 5.5million units.

There are a total of 46 Nintendo 64 games on this list which are confirmed to have sold or shipped at least one million units. Of these, 13 were developed by internal Nintendo development divisions. Other developers with the most million-selling games include Rare and AKI Corporation, with seven and four games respectively in the list of 46. Of the 46 games on this list, 32 were published in one or more regions by Nintendo. Other publishers with multiple million-selling games include THQ with four games, Rare with three games, and Acclaim Entertainment with two games. The most popular franchises on Nintendo 64 include Pokémon (14.55million combined units), The Legend of Zelda (10.96million combined units), Donkey Kong (10.15million combined units), and Star Wars (7.87million combined units).

List

Notes

References

External links
 Nintendo official homepage

Nintendo 64
Best-selling Nintendo 64 video games